Jacob Landau may refer to:
 Jacob ben Judah Landau (died 1493), German-Italian rabbi
 Jacob Landau (artist) (1917–2001), American artist
 Jacob M. Landau (born 1924), Israeli political scientist
 Jacob Landau (journalist) (1934–2008), American journalist
 Jacob Landau (Jewish Telegraphic Agency)

See also
 Jack Landau (disambiguation)